Cooper Creek is a tributary stream of the Braden River, in turn a tributary of the Manatee River, located in both Manatee County, Florida and Sarasota County, Florida.

References

Rivers of Manatee County, Florida
Rivers of Sarasota County, Florida